Shilpi Sharma may refer to:

 Shilpi Sharma (actress, born 1994)
 Shilpi Sharma (DJ)